Patrick Timothy Harker (born November 19, 1958) is the President of the Federal Reserve Bank of Philadelphia.  Harker previously served as the President of  University of Delaware. He was the dean of the Wharton School of the University of Pennsylvania from 2001 to 2007. He began his presidency of the University of Delaware in 2007 and resigned in 2015.

Early life and career
Harker grew up in Gloucester City, New Jersey. He graduated from St. Mary's School in Gloucester City in 1973, and was a scholar athlete at Gloucester Catholic High School.

Before receiving his Ph.D. from the University of Pennsylvania in 1983, Harker worked as a consulting engineer in Philadelphia and New York City.  He was a faculty member of the University of California, Santa Barbara from 1983–1984.

Harker was named a Presidential Young Investigator by the National Science Foundation in 1986 and as a White House Fellow by President George H.W. Bush in 1991. In the latter position, he spent 1991-1992 as a Special Assistant to the Director of the Federal Bureau of Investigation.

University of Pennsylvania
Harker joined the Wharton School of the University of Pennsylvania in 1984. From 1994 to 1996, Harker served as a professor and Chair of the Systems Engineering Department in Penn's School of Engineering and Applied Science.

Harker served as chair of Wharton’s Operations and Information Management Department. In February 2000, he was appointed dean of the Wharton School and Reliance Professor of Management and Private Enterprise. He was a senior fellow at the Wharton Financial Institutions Center and held a secondary appointment as a professor of Electrical and Systems Engineering at Penn. He also served as director of the school's Fishman-Davidson Center for the Study of the Service Sector. When he was named UPS Transportation Professor of the Private Sector in 1991, Dr. Harker became the youngest faculty member in Wharton’s history awarded an endowed professorship. From 1996–99, he served as editor-in-chief of the premier journal Operations Research.

While at Penn, Harker supervised the work of 18 Ph.D. candidates and four Master's students. Also at Penn, he was principal investigator or co-principal investigator on 16 research grants totaling more than $11 million.

University of Delaware
Harker was selected as the 26th President of the University of Delaware on December 1, 2006. He took office on July 1, 2007.

In May 2008, Dr. Harker unveiled a sweeping strategic plan, UD’s Path to Prominence, predicated on excellence in undergraduate, graduate and professional education, environmental leadership, global engagement and service to the community. He has established numerous research centers, as well as the Office of Economic Innovation and Partnerships, which stimulates invention and entrepreneurship and translates UD research into economy-driving technologies. To establish Delaware as a health sciences hub, UD has partnered with the region’s leading health care providers in the Delaware Health Sciences Alliance.

During his tenure as president, the University of Delaware acquired a 272-acre property adjacent to the Newark campus that is now being developed as the Science, Technology and Advanced Research (STAR) Campus. Future development of this campus is designed to establish it as a center of innovation, focused on leading research in areas such as health science, cybersecurity and alternative energy. Currently, the campus is home to UD's Health Sciences Complex, California-based Bloom Energy's East Coast fuel cell manufacturing center and the University's eV2g project, a two-way interface between electric vehicles and the electric grid.

Major construction projects on the campus since Dr. Harker became president include the 194,000-square-foot Interdisciplinary Science and Engineering Laboratory (ISE Lab), a hub for teaching and research on campus; Louis L. Redding and Eliphalet Gilbert Residence Halls; a new University of Delaware Bookstore; and upgrades to campus athletics facilities, including an addition to the Bob Carpenter Center and a major renovation of the Carpenter Sports Building.

In 2012, Dr. Harker was named a charter fellow of the National Academy of Inventors for his outstanding personal contributions to innovation and for facilitating and nurturing patents, licensing and commercialization for the purpose of economic development for the University and the state of Delaware.

He received the INFORMS Fellows Award in recognition of outstanding lifetime achievement in operations research and the management sciences in 2012. He was recognized "for remarkable leadership at the organizations he leads and for his contributions to the theory of variational inequalities and his editorial services to INFORMS." The Institute for Operations Research and the Management Sciences (INFORMS) is an international scientific society with 10,000 members.

His op-eds have been published in The New York Times, The Chronicle of Higher Education, The Philadelphia Inquirer and The (Delaware) News Journal. In December 2014, his commentary, "Making Sense of Higher Education's Future: An Economics and Operations Perspective," was published in Service Science.

Dr. Harker was a Class B director of the Federal Reserve Bank of Philadelphia until he was appointed as the Bank's President and a member of the Homeland Security Academic Advisory Council. He serves on the boards of Christiana Care Health Systems, First State Innovation, Catholic Relief Services, Easter Seals of Delaware, Decision Lens, Pepco Holdings, Huntsman Corp. and The Minerva Project, as well as many other community and nonprofit groups. He is a member of the Regional Leadership Initiative Steering Committee at the Council on Competitiveness and a member of the CEO Council for Growth at the Greater Philadelphia Chamber of Commerce.

Harker's compensation for the 2008–2009 fiscal year was $810,603. His pay for 2009–2010 was $726,307, and his pay for 2010–2011 was $728,329.

During his career, Harker has published several books and more than 100 articles, chapters and reports.

Federal Reserve Bank of Philadelphia
On March 2, 2015, Harker was named the 11th president and chief executive officer of the Federal Reserve Bank of Philadelphia. Harker, who had served as a nonbanking Class B director of the Philadelphia Fed for the past three years, succeeded Charles Plosser, who retired effective March 1, 2015.

References

1958 births
Federal Reserve Bank of Philadelphia presidents
Fellows of the Institute for Operations Research and the Management Sciences
Gloucester Catholic High School alumni
Living people
People from Gloucester City, New Jersey
People from Haddon Heights, New Jersey
Presidents of the University of Delaware
University of California, Santa Barbara faculty
University of Pennsylvania faculty
University of Pennsylvania School of Engineering and Applied Science alumni